Doug Lefler (born in California) is an American film director, screenwriter, film producer and storyboard artist, best known as director of the Dragonheart fantasy adventure film sequel Dragonheart: A New Beginning and The Last Legion.

Career
Lefler was born in Southern California, and started making his first home movies at the age of twelve. He started in the film industry as an animator, having made short films as a child and then attended the California Institute of the Arts. His classmates included Tim Burton, John Lasseter, John Musker and Brad Bird. After two years, he worked for Disney and other studios for several years as a storyboard artist and animator, before progressing to directing.  He worked for many years as a writer and storyboard artist on live-action features before getting his first chance to direct second unit on Sam Raimi's Army of Darkness in 1991.

Selected filmography
The Last Legion (2007) (director)
Dragonheart: A New Beginning (2000) (director)
Day of the Dead (episode, 1998) (director)
Cold Reality/Mortal Kombat: Conquest (episode, 1998) (director)
The Road to Calydon (episode of Hercules: The Legendary Journeys, 1995) (director)
The Wrong Path (episode of Hercules: The Legendary Journeys, 1994) (director)
Hercules and the Circle of Fire (episode, 1994) (director)
Army of Darkness (1991) (second unit director)
Steel Dawn (1987) (screenwriter)

References

External links

Doug Lefler's Online Graphic Novel

American animators
Film producers from California
American male screenwriters
American television directors
California Institute of the Arts alumni
Living people
Place of birth missing (living people)
Year of birth missing (living people)
American film producers
American storyboard artists
Screenwriters from California